The Cheetah Girls: One World (also known as The Cheetah Girls 3 or The Cheetah Girls 3: One World) is a 2008 Disney Channel Original Movie which premiered on Disney Channel on August 22, 2008. It is the third and final film of The Cheetah Girls trilogy, and the only film not to feature Raven-Symoné.

Plot
With Galleria away at Cambridge, Chanel (Adrienne Bailon), Dorinda (Sabrina Bryan), and Aqua (Kiely Williams) are left as a trio and are cast in the lavish Bollywood movie "Namaste Bombay". The Cheetah Girls travel across the globe to India. There, they meet Rahim (Rupak Ginn), the man cast as the lead, whom they realize is attractive, yet somewhat clumsy. After meeting the movie's choreographer, Gita (Deepti Daryanani), a dance battle erupts between themselves and Gita with her backup dancers. They subsequently discover that the musical's director, Vikram "Vik" (Michael Steger), must choose only one Cheetah for the role as the budget is only enough for one star.

When it becomes apparent that they must travel home, they are upset, until realizing they may each try out for the lead. Though they all make a promise to be fair in the competition, situations arise in which each member becomes jealous of the others' specific talents. Chanel befriends Vik, Dorinda befriends Rahim, and Aqua befriends  a boy she has been in contact with since before leaving America, Amar (Kunal Sharma). Each girl is led to believe the producer of the film, Khamal (Roshan Seth), Vik's uncle, will choose her after the audition. Chanel is told because she is the better singer, she will receive the role, while Dorinda is promised the role as she is the best dancer, while Aqua is convinced the coveted role will be hers as she is the best actress. The three Cheetahs audition against one another with Chanel being awarded the role, which she later refuses realizing, as do the other Cheetahs, that friendship and unity are more important than furthering their individual or group careers.

After refusing the role, they set to convince Khamal to award Gita as the lead, to which he reluctantly agrees, ending in a scene from "Namaste Bombay" in which the Cheetahs sing and dance the titular song, "One World".

Cast
 Adrienne Bailon as Chanel "Chuchie" Simmons
 Sabrina Bryan as Dorinda "Do" Thomas
 Kiely Williams as Aquanette "Aqua" Walker
 Michael Steger as Vikram, the director of Namaste Bombay.
 Rupak Ginn as Rahim, the lead actor in Namaste Bombay. 
 Kunal Sharma as Amar, a man that Aqua befriends, and has been in contact with since before leaving America. 
 Roshan Seth as Uncle Kamal Bhatia, Vik's uncle, and the producer of Namaste Bombay. 
 Deepti Daryanani as Gita, the choreographer for Namaste Bombay.
 Vinod Nagpal as Swami Ji

Production
In early 2007, Disney Channel announced the film with the plot involving the Cheetah Girls going to India to star in a Bollywood production. Like The Cheetah Girls 2, it was filmed on location in a foreign country, for a three-month period in India. Bailon was doing the research for the film during the filming. Although Bailon said in March that "all of the original cast will be back", Raven-Symoné later confirmed in August not to return for this film due to "catfights" and "territorial issues" behind the scenes of the second film. Nearly a decade later, Symoné would reveal she did not appear in the third film due to feeling "excluded" and "ostracized" during production of The Cheetah Girls 2.

The film was shot on location in Udaipur and Mumbai in India from January to April 2008. Like High School Musical 2, Disney Channel featured a "play your part" role, where viewers and fans could choose elements of the film through the website. This took place from December 31, 2007 to February 1, 2008.

Soundtrack

The soundtrack was released on August 19, 2008.
The soundtrack contains elements of both hip hop and Indian music.

 "Cheetah Love" by The Cheetah Girls
 "Dig a Little Deeper" by The Cheetah Girls
 "Dance Me If You Can" by The Cheetah Girls, and Deepti Daryanani
 "Fly Away" by The Cheetah Girls
 "Stand Up" by Adrienne Bailon
 "What If" by Adrienne Bailon
 "I'm the One" by The Cheetah Girls, Michael Steger, Rupak Ginn, and Kunal Sharma 
 "No Place Like Us" by The Cheetah Girls
 "One World" by The Cheetah Girls, Deepti Daryanani, and Rupak Ginn
 "Feels Like Love" by The Cheetah Girls, Deepti Daryanani, Michael Steger, Rupak Ginn, and Kunal Sharma (featured on the DVD/Blu-ray disc on the extended edition)
 "Crazy on the Dance Floor" by Sabrina Bryan
 "Circle Game" by Kiely Williams

Reception
The movie premiered to over 6.2 million viewers, and reached 7 million viewers in its final half hour. This still failed to meet the ratings of the first two and was the series' lowest-rated premiere. In the UK, its premiere night scored 412,000 on Disney Channel UK, making it #1 of the week, and received 182,000 on Disney Channel UK +1, also #1 on that channel for the week, totalling 594,000.

DVD and Blu-ray
The "Extended Music Edition" DVD and Blu-ray Disc of The Cheetah Girls: One World, was released on December 16, 2008 in the United States. It includes an exclusive music sequence titled "Feels Like Love", as well as a downloadable exclusive remixed version of "Feels Like Love". It also featured a "Rock-Along" mode, "Cheetah Spots", and an alternate version of the movie with pop-up fun facts and music videos. The Region 2 DVD was released on March 16, 2009.

References

External links
  
 

2008 television films
2008 films
2008 comedy-drama films
2008 in American television
2000s buddy comedy films
2000s female buddy films
2000s musical comedy-drama films
2000s teen comedy-drama films
American buddy comedy-drama films
American female buddy films
American musical comedy-drama films
American sequel films
American teen comedy-drama films
American teen musical films
The Cheetah Girls films
Comedy-drama television films
Films about Bollywood
Films about musical groups
Films directed by Paul Hoen
Films set in India
Films set in New York City
Films shot in Mumbai
Films shot in Rajasthan
Films shot in India
Musical television films
Television sequel films
2000s English-language films
2000s American films